Strahinja Jovanović (born 1 June 1999) is a Serbian professional footballer who plays as a forward for Žarkovo.

Club career
Born in Leskovac, Jovanović came through the youth system at Partizan. He was loaned to their affiliated side Teleoptik in early 2017. Subsequently, Jovanović helped the side win the Serbian League Belgrade and promotion to the Serbian First League.

In early 2018, Jovanović returned to Partizan and was given the number 90 shirt. He made his competitive debut for the club on 5 May 2018, coming on as a substitute for Zoran Tošić in their 2–2 home league draw versus Napredak Kruševac.

In July 2018, Jovanović was loaned to newly promoted Serbian SuperLiga club Proleter Novi Sad. He returned to Partizan in early 2019, before being loaned back to Teleoptik until the end of the season.

International career
Jovanović made his debut for Serbia at under-19 level during the 2018 UEFA European Under-19 Championship qualifying stage. He made his debut for the under-21 team in a friendly against the Qatar U23s in December 2017.

Honours
Teleoptik
 Serbian League Belgrade: 2016–17
Partizan
 Serbian Cup: 2017–18

Notes

References

External links
 
 

Sportspeople from Leskovac
Serbian footballers
1999 births
Living people
Association football forwards
Serbia under-21 international footballers
Serbia youth international footballers
FK Partizan players
FK Proleter Novi Sad players
FK Teleoptik players
FK Spartak Subotica players
OFK Žarkovo players
Serbian First League players
Serbian SuperLiga players